Matteo Nannini (born 10 July 2003) is an Italian-Argentine racing driver who currently competes in  Indy NXT for Juncos Hollinger Racing. His father is a first cousin of former Formula One driver Alessandro Nannini and of singer Gianna Nannini.

Racing career

Karting
Nannini started karting at the age of 6 where he would go on to win a number of karting championships. In 2015 Nannini joined Fernando Alonso's karting team, and this is where Nannini won his second competition at Trofeo dei Campioni in Italy.

Formula 4
After competing in other lower formulas, Nannini had the most success in the 2019 Formula 4 UAE Championship where he won 7 races and won the title by 48 points over Joshua Dürksen.

FIA Formula 3 Championship

2020
In his second year of single-seater racing, Nannini moved up to the FIA Formula 3 Championship with Jenzer Motorsport. Nannini struggled throughout the first half of the season, claiming his first point score in Round 6 in Barcelona. He finished in 10th in the first race, which gave him reverse-grid pole. Nannini then managed to claim his first and only podium with a 3rd place in the second race of the weekend. Nannini failed to score any points for the rest of the season and finished 18th overall in the championship with 11 points.

2021
Nannini returned to the series in 2021 with HWA Racelab. Nannini once again struggled, but not as badly as the previous season. He qualified 4th at the first round in Barcelona, and was fighting for the win in Race 2 before being caught up in a collision with Dennis Hauger, with Nannini retiring and Hauger finishing 25th. He bounced back with a 3rd place finish in Race 3. At the first race in Spielberg, Nannini was fighting for the win with Clement Novalak before the pair of them collided at Turn 4, with Novalak retiring and Nannini finishing 23rd. Nannini took his first F3 win at Budapest in Race 2, where he overtook Roman Stanek at the start and Enzo Fittipaldi in the early stages of the race to go on and win comfortably. Afterwards he only got one more points finish, and finished 14th overall in the championship with 44 points, and was the highest placed HWA driver.

2022
Nannini joined ART Grand Prix for the second mid-season test at Barcelona, replacing Juan Manuel Correa who was out due to a foot injury. He was not called up to replace Correa for the next round at Imola, and ART only ran 2 cars there.

FIA Formula 2 Championship
Nannini was set to perform double duties in both F3 and Formula 2 in 2021, partnering Alessio Deledda at HWA Racelab.

In May 2021, Nannini announced he would be solely focusing on the Formula 3 championship after his sponsor ended support for a Formula 2 campaign. Williams Academy driver Jack Aitken replaced Nannini for the Monaco and Baku rounds. Nannini would return to the championship with Campos Racing, racing in Baku and Silverstone after Gianluca Petecof had left the team.

Stock car racing
On March 22, 2022, Team Stange Racing had announced that they would be returning to the ARCA Menards Series with their No. 46 car, which was last fielded in 2016, with Nannini driving it in the race at Mid-Ohio. This would be his debut in a stock car. However, the team did not end up entering the race.

Indy NXT 
Nannini returned to full-time racing in 2023, driving for Juncos Hollinger Racing in the 2023 Indy NXT.

Karting record

Karting career summary 

† As Nannini was a guest driver, he was ineligible to score points.

Racing record

Racing career summary

† As Nannini was a guest driver, he was ineligible for points.

Complete Formula 4 UAE Championship results 
(key) (Races in bold indicate pole position; races in italics indicate fastest lap)

Complete Formula Regional European Championship results 
(key) (Races in bold indicate pole position; races in italics indicate fastest lap)

Complete FIA Formula 3 Championship results
(key) (Races in bold indicate pole position; races in italics indicate points for the fastest lap of top ten finishers)

† Driver did not finish the race, but was classified as they completed more than 90% of the race distance.

Complete FIA Formula 2 Championship results 
(key) (Races in bold indicate pole position) (Races in italics indicate points for the fastest lap of top ten finishers)

American open-wheel racing results

Indy NXT
(key) (Races in bold indicate pole position) (Races in italics indicate fastest lap) (Races with L indicate a race lap led) (Races with * indicate most race laps led)

References

External links
 

2003 births
Living people
Italian racing drivers
Spanish F4 Championship drivers
Formula Renault Eurocup drivers
FIA Formula 3 Championship drivers
Formula Regional European Championship drivers
FIA Formula 2 Championship drivers
MP Motorsport drivers
Jenzer Motorsport drivers
Campos Racing drivers
HWA Team drivers
Argentine racing drivers
Monolite Racing drivers
Karting World Championship drivers
Indy Lights drivers
Juncos Hollinger Racing drivers
UAE F4 Championship drivers